U.S. Bicycle Route 20 (USBR 20) is a U.S. Numbered Bicycle Route that is planned to run from the Oregon Coast to Marine City, Michigan. , sections of the route in Washington state and Michigan have been approved by the American Association of State Highway and Transportation Officials (AASHTO), comprising .

Route description

|-
|WA || 
|-
|MN || 
|-
|MI || 
|-
|Total || 
|}

Washington

The route runs  from the Columbia–Walla Walla county line near Lewis and Clark Trail State Park to the Idaho state line at Clarkston, Washington, following U.S. Route 12.

Minnesota

It starts at the North Dakota border at Moorhead and the Red River. From there it is on roads and trails to Pelican Rapids. It merges with the Heart of the Lakes Trail to Maplewood State Park, and then to Fergus Falls on a section of the North Country Trail. It continues on the Central Lakes Trail to Osakis and then the Lake Wobegon Regional Trail and on to the Mississippi River at St. Cloud.

Michigan

The route connects with ferries on both sides of Michigan's Lower Peninsula. In Marine City in the east, it meets the Bluewater Ferry which connects to Sombra, Ontario, Canada. In the west, it connects to the Lake Michigan Carferry from Ludington, Michigan, to Manitowoc, Wisconsin.

History

On May 4, 2011, AASHTO voted to approve the Michigan Department of Transportation's application for designation of the  Michigan segment of the route. 

The Washington section was approved by AASHTO in August 2021.

The Minnesota section was announced by Adventure Cycling Association on June 28, 2022. 

The remaining sections of the route are not yet well-defined, but it is planned to run through Idaho, Montana, North Dakota, and Wisconsin as well as Washington, Minnesota, and Michigan.

References

External links

 Interactive Map of the Route

20
Bike paths in Michigan
Bike paths in Washington (state)
Bike paths in Wisconsin
Bike paths in Oregon